The England women's national under-23 football team, also known as England women Under-23s or England women U23(s), is an association football team operated under the auspices of The Football Association.

Its primary role is the development of players in preparation for the senior England women's national football team. As long as they were eligible, players can play for England at any level, making it possible to play for the U23s, senior side, and again for the U23s, as Natasha Dowie, Rachel Williams and Danielle Buet have done recently. In 2005 Casey Stoney played for the team in the Nordic Cup, despite already having 30 caps at senior level. It is also possible to play for one country at youth level and another at senior level (providing the player is eligible). Helen Lander and Kylie Davies decided to play for Wales at senior level after playing for England U23s, while Sophie Perry elected to play for Ireland.

History

Beginnings
In February 1987 the Women's Football Association (WFA) appointed Liz Deighan to run a women's national under-21 team. Deighan had been a star midfielder in the England team which reached the 1984 European Competition for Women's Football. Four years later Deighan was not re–appointed and John Bilton took over. The team folded shortly afterwards because the WFA had run out of money. Eight of England's squad at the 1995 FIFA Women's World Cup had come through Deighan's U-21 team, including Pauline Cope, Karen Burke and Louise Waller.

FA sanctioned team
In summer 2004, The Football Association (FA) decided to reconstitute the U-21 team in order to give women a higher level of play to better prepare them for the full national team. Senior team manager Hope Powell held a four-day camp in Shropshire and announced: "This is a major step forward for our international teams and will bridge the gap between Under-19 and Senior levels. We have been observing players in this age bracket for the last six months and with the clubs' assistance I believe we can make this a real success." Powell installed her full-time assistant with the senior team, Brent Hills, as coach of the team, which remained an U-21 selection from 2004 through 2008.

Competing as an U-23 team (2008–2018)
2008 saw the change of England's youth national women's team moved to the U-23 level. The move was made by the FA in response to age-level changes FIFA had made to its oldest women's youth competition, now named FIFA U-20 Women's World Cup. The age limit was raised from being a U-19 tournament to a U-20 tournament. This adjustment, coupled with a newly introduced U-23 age limit to the Nordic Cup, prompted the FA to rethink and eventually change the youth development team. The team continues to serve as a stepping-stone for players to the England women's national team. Brent Hills explained that it had become more of a challenge to break into the senior team: "When I started, if you were an extremely talented 18-year-old you may have been able to get into the senior team. I'll give you an example, Fara Williams. You would have to be the next Kelly Smith now to be able to do that."

England U23s did not have a permanent home. When England hosted a tournament in 2010, the event was held at University of Warwick where it was possible to attend and watch without a ticket. Because of the smaller demand compared to the senior women's national team, much smaller grounds could be used.

The team's last competitive tournament was the 2012 Four Nations Tournament, in which England finished third. They also competed in a variety of competitions, including the annual Nordic Cup, which was previously the top competition for this age group.

Move to U-21 system (2018–2021) 
In a bid to better aid the transition between the youth pathway and senior football, the FA announced in September 2018 that they were scrapping the U23s and U20s levels in order to form an Under-21s age group, which would become the top tier of the nation's professional development phase. The move would align England's structure to that used in other European countries to allow for more age-appropriate games and better manage individual player development post-U20 World Cup for those who have genuine senior team potential. The then U20s manager Mo Marley was announced as head coach.

Return of U-23 level (2021) 
In October 2021, the FA announced the return of an under-23 team as newly appointed senior manager Sarina Wiegman looked to increase international playing opportunities for promising players in the senior pathway, particularly those who had aged out of the under-21 squad. Mo Marley was appointed head coach and tasked with also mentoring Emma Coates and Fara Williams as coaches. The move came off the back of the cancellation of two editions of the UEFA Women's Under-19 Championship and one FIFA U-20 Women's World Cup as a result of the COVID-19 pandemic, further limiting opportunities for youth international experience.

Current players

Head coach: Mo Marley

Recent call-ups
The following players have also been called up to the England squad within the last 12 months.

Recent schedule and results

2022

2023

Coaches
  Liz Deighan (1987–1992)
  Brent Hills (2004–2013)
  Marieanne Spacey (2013–2018)
  Mo Marley (2021–present)

References

Bibliography

 

Under-23
Youth football in England
European women's national under-23 association football teams
Women's national under-23 association football teams